Glass tetra may refer to:
Glass bloodfin tetra (Prionobrama filigera)
Xenagoniates bondi (Long-finned glass tetra)